The women's quadruple sculls competition at the 1988 Summer Olympics took place at took place at Han River Regatta Course, South Korea.

Competition format

The competition consisted of two main rounds (heats and finals) as well as a repechage. The 10 boats were divided into two heats for the first round, with 5 boats in each heat. The winner of each heat (2 boats total) advanced directly to the "A" final (for 1st through 6th place). The remaining 8 boats were placed in the repechage. The repechage featured two heats, with 4 boats in each heat. The top two boats in each repechage heat (4 boats total) advanced to the "A" final. The remaining 4 boats (3rd and 4th placers in the repechage heats) were eliminated from medal contention and competed in the "B" final for 7th through 10th place.

All races were over a 2000 metre course, unlike previous Games in which women used a 1000 metre course.

Results

Heats

Heat 1

Heat 2

Repechage

Repechage heat 1

Repechage heat 2

Finals

Final B

Final A

Final classification

References

Rowing at the 1988 Summer Olympics
Women's rowing at the 1988 Summer Olympics